Alstonville is a town in northern New South Wales, Australia, part of the region known as the Northern Rivers. Alstonville is on the Bruxner Highway between the town of Ballina (13 km to the east) and city of Lismore (19 km to the west). The village of Wollongbar is 4 km to the west of Alstonville. Alstonville is the service centre of the area known as the Alstonville Plateau.

History

Europeans  were first attracted to the area, known as the Big Scrub, in the 1840s by the plentiful supply of Red Cedar. It was not until 1865 that the first  settlers selected land in the area, then known as the parish of  Tuckombil. Some notable selections in the first five years include that of the Freeborn, Roberston, Graham, Newborn, Crawford, Mellis, and Newton  families. By 1883  Alstonville boasted two pubs, six stores, two black-smiths, nine sugar mills, and four saw mills.

Sugar cane was an important industry to the early settlers, with many small mills operating across the district. These were later replaced by larger more efficient steam mills such as those erected in 1882 at Alstonville  (owned by the Melbourne Sugar Company) adjacent to Maguires Creek and at Rous Mill adjacent to Youngman Creek. By 1896 the Rous mill boasted a  light rail line to transport cane from Alstonville. From the 1890s ownward, dairies became common across the area, later becoming the  dominant industry for the first half of the 20th century. The first  butter factories were located at Wollongbah (1889), Rous (1889) and  Teven Road (1890). In 1900  the NSW Creamery Butter Company built the Alstonville factory near Maguires Creek, which was  sometime later acquired by NORCO. After closing this building  became a caravan factory, peanut  factory, and finally a furniture  factory, which is still open today.

One notable former resident of  Alstonville is Patrick Joseph Bugden who was awarded a Victoria Cross  (the highest military decoration which can be awarded to a member of  the armed forces of the Commonwealth). "Paddy" served as a member of the  31st Battalion AIF during the First World War. The annual Anzac day parade starts at the Paddy Bugden Memorial, which is situated on Bugden Avenue.

Origin of the name
The  village was originally known as "Duck Creek Mountain" after Duck Creek, which flows along the southern edge of town eventually merging with Emigrant Creek and the Richmond River. The name was given by the cedar cutters because of the abundance of wild duck on the upper tidal  reaches of the creek.  In 1873, due to conflict of the original name with a different duck creek the first postmaster and owner of the general store John Perry proposed the name "Alstonville". Alstonville, also the name of the Perry farm, was derived from Alston the maiden name of his wife Annie Alston.

Population
In the 2016 Census, there were 5,066 people in the Alstonville urban centre. 84.5% of people were born in Australia. The next most common country of birth was England at 3.8%.  92.6% of people only spoke English at home. The most common responses for religion were No Religion 29.5%, Catholic 20.4% and Anglican 19.0%.

Facilities
Crawford house, a pioneer house situated next to Elizabeth Ann Brown park is now a historical museum. Directly behind is the town's major shopping centre, Alstonville Plaza, which has a few specialty shops, and a major supermarket. The town has a post office but no longer has any bank.

Summerland Farm, previously known as the "Summerland House With No Steps", has been operating near Alstonville since 1971. A business of Aruma, formerly House with No Steps, Summerland Farm provides training and employment for in excess of 100 people with a disability in fields such as farming and hospitality. A must see tourist attraction, major distribution hub for regional farms and a working avocado and macadamia farm, Summerland Farm is one of the region's oldest and most successful tourism and horticulture businesses.

Alstonville has two stationed emergency services, Fire & Rescue NSW’ Station 204 and NSW Police.

Economy
An industrial estate is located in Russleton Park, with cement, macadamia processing and rural supplies dominating. In addition, numerous bus depots are located here, and there is a mail sorting facility. The industrial estate is located across the highway from Wollongbar; however, it is not a part of Wollongbar.

Schools
The town of Alstonville is home to two public and one private school: Alstonville Public School (state primary), St Joseph's School (Catholic primary) and Alstonville High School (state secondary). In 2016 the newly built Alstonville Preschool was opened, situated next to the Olympic Swimming Pool.

Transport
Transport between Alstonville and Wollongbar, is by either car, or foot/bike, as a path runs between Bulwinkel Park and the shopping centre at Wollongbar.

Bus services are limited. There are no buses into or out of Alstonville at night or on weekends. As a result, the area has experienced problems with petty crimes and public nuisances.

Transport issues
A  bypass has been constructed for  the Bruxner Highway to remove congestion and improve safety. Previously  Alstonville traffic became unusually congested (for such a small-population town) because its main road was the main thoroughfare between Lismore and  Ballina. All three schools (and bus stops for another three schools) are located in a bottleneck with only one entry/exit road; as a result, parking for all three schools is usually congested.

Sporting Teams on the Plateau
The area has many parks, including Geoff Watt Oval, the major sporting ground for Cricket, and Soccer, and Crawford Park, across the other side of the highway. This park is a second sporting ground for soccer.

The Alstonville and District Football Club is the local Soccer Club, and is known as "Villa" and is uniformed with red and black.
Wollongbar Alstonville Piooners Rugby (WAR) is the local Rugby Union club, located at Wollongbar
Alstonville & District Cricket Club is Alstonville’s only cricket team. Each year they have a team in the  LJ Hooker League They play at Geoff Watt Oval, Hill Park Oval & Gap Road

Alstonville is also the home of FNC NSW Futsal at the Alstonville Entertainment Centre.

Interesting facts

Andesanthus lepidotus 'Alstonville' is a small tree grown in many parts of Australia for its brilliant display of purple flowers in autumn. This variety along with the dwarf variety 'Jules' was developed by Ken Dunstan a resident of Alstonville, hence the name.

The world's first commercial orchard of macadamia trees was planted in the early 1880s by Charles Staff at Rous Mill, on the Alstonville plateau, 7 km south west of the centre of town.

Media 
Alstonville is serviced by a Christian radio station on FM 88.0 MHz, as well as the nearby local stations of 101.9 Paradise FM (Ballina), and 100.9 ZZZ FM (Lismore).

Notable residents 
 Rachael Beck, actress
 Doug Daley, rugby league player and administrator
 Nicholas Hamilton, actor
 Russell Strong, surgeon

References

External links

Ballina Shire Council
Town information — Sydney Morning Herald
Summerland House
Alstonville High School
Alstonville Preschool
Alstonville Plateau Historical Society
Northern Rivers Geology Blog - Alstonville Plateau

Towns in New South Wales
Northern Rivers